Olanrewaju Adeyemi Tejuoso (born 1964) is a Nigerian politician. He was a senator from Ogun State at the 8th Assembly.

Background
Tejuoso was born in Abeokuta as a prince of the dynasty of HRM Oba Dr. Adedapo Tejuoso, CON, Karunwi III, Oranmiyan, the Osile of Oke-Ona Egba, and Olori Adetoun Tejuoso. As the son of the Oba, he is also the grand son of one of the first female industrialists in Nigeria, Iyaloye Bisoye Tejuoso, the Iyalode of Egbaland.

He represented Ogun Center in the 8th National Assembly where he was the chairman, Senate Committee on Health.

Prince Lanre Tejuosho is a member of the All Progressives Congress (APC). He was the chairman of the National Convention Committee of Congress for Progressive Change (CPC) party in 2011 that led to the emergence of General Muhammad Buhari as the Presidential flag bearer of Congress for Progressive Change (CPC) before it was merged to form All Progressive Congress (APC). He has also served as the Commissioner for Youths and Sports, Environment Ministry and Special Duties under the governorship of Senator Ibikunle Amosun.

Childhood and education
Lanre Tejuoso is a medical doctor. He started his elementary education at the University of Lagos Staff School in 1967 and was later at Igbobi College, Lagos in 1974 for his secondary education. In 1981, he was admitted into University of Lagos where He obtained his MBBS and later accomplished his specialties in telemedicine and medical computing abroad. He became a doctor at the age of 21, making him one of the youngest doctors in Nigeria.

Public service and private enterprise
Tejuoso completed his National Youth Service at the Nigerian Ports Authority Medical Hospital where he participated in the National Youth Service Corps (NYSC) Scheme. After his service year, he had a brief stint at Teju Hospital, now Iyaode Bisoye Tejuoso Hospital, where he practiced as a medical officer.
 
Tejuoso was on the board of many blue chip companies including Berger Paints Nigeria PLC, Custodian and Allied Insurance, Teju Industries Ltd, Iyalode Bisoye Tejuoso Hospital and Adonai Petroleum. He is the founder of Avicenna International School and Buckswood School. He was also the president of Rotary Club of Tejuoso, Surulere Lagos from 1990 to 1991 and was the Chairman of Lagos Badminton Association between 1993 and 1994. He founded a Non-governmental organization – Iyalode Bisoye Tejuoso Malaria Foundation to give medical assistance to the masses for free.

Political campaign and governance
Prince Lanre joined Ogun politics in 2007 when he made an attempt to represent the Ogun Central Senatorial District on the platform of All Nigeria Peoples Party (ANPP) in the Senate during the tenure of Chief Olusegun Obasanjo as president but lost out to Iyabo Obasanjo-Bello. He remained determine despite several assassination attempts.

At the formation of the Congress for Progressive Change (CPC) in 2010, he emerged a strong force to reckon with in the party in Ogun State and was made the chairman of the National Convention Committee of Congress for Progressive Change (CPC) party in 2011 that led to the emergence of General Muhammad Buhari as the party flag bearer, he raised the hand of Muhammadu Buhari as the presidential candidate of the party in the 2011 presidential election, at the party's national convention at the Eagle Square in Abuja.

He later joined the then Action Congress of Nigeria (ACN) that teamed up with Congress for Progressive Change CPC, All Nigeria Peoples Party (ANPP) and a faction of the All Progressives Grand Alliance (APGA) to form the All Peoples Congress.

Prince Lanre had, prior to his election as a senator, served the people of Ogun State as commissioner in the administration of Governor Ibikunle Amosun, handling three different portfolios of Youth and Sports, Environment and Special Duties. As a commissioner, he is credited with achieving distribution of 500 electricity transformers to all parts of the state; management of a seven megawatt power plant; modernization of the June 12 Cultural Centre; introduction of solar power to rural areas; upgrading of the major dam that provides water to residents of Abeokuta; introduction of special marshals for environment and modernization of the MKO Abiola Stadium.

Senator of the Federal Republic of Nigeria
Senator Lanre Tejuoso was elected to the Senate of the Federal Republic of Nigeria as the All Progressive Congress (APC) candidate from Ogun Center in April 2015.
He is the Pro-Chancellor of the University of Lagos appointed by President Buhari 2021

Personal life
Senator Tejuoso is married to Oloori Moji Tejuoso (née Okoya). The Oloori is one of the daughters of the renowned Nigerian businessman, Chief Razaq Okoya. She is a philanthropist and socialite. They are blessed with children and grandchildren.

References

External links
 http://www.sltyouthcenter.com

1964 births
Living people
Members of the Senate (Nigeria)
Yoruba politicians
All Progressives Congress politicians
Nigerian Christians
Politicians from Abeokuta
Medical doctors from Ogun State
University of Lagos alumni
Lanre
Igbobi College alumni
Nigerian princes
Yoruba princes